The  is a minivan with seven or eight seats that was initially sold only in Japan as a competitor to the Toyota Alphard and the Nissan Elgrand. One of the major differences in the third-generation JDM Honda Odyssey is that the rear doors were changed to sliding doors, typically used on minivans, whereas the JDM Odyssey used conventional doors. The US variant of the Honda Odyssey, known in Japan as the Honda LaGreat, was too large for Japan, so the Elysion took many styling cues from the LaGreat and used them on a smaller vehicle. 

In June 2012, the Elysion was introduced to the Chinese market. Production of the Elysion ceased in October 2013 in Japan, but it continued to be assembled and sold in China.

Honda was inspired to name the vehicle the "Elysion" from the classical Greek word Elysium, or heaven.



First generation (RR; 2004) 

The first generation Elysion appeared at the Tokyo Motor Show, in October 2003 as the "ASM", and was released for sale on 13 May 2004. A mild body restyle was introduced 29 September 2005, introducing an "Aero" and "VG Premium" trim level. 13th January 2006 saw the introduction of the "G Aero HDD Navi" and "VG HDD Navi Aero" editions. Another styling change was introduced on 21st  December 2006, including an interior update.

The Elysion was offered with either the 2.4 L DOHC direct injection K24A with i-VTEC producing  or the 3.0 L SOHC J30A V6 i-VTEC producing . The V6 was also available with "VCM" or Variable Cylinder Management. The upper trim level "Prestige" model was available with the J35A V6 used in the Honda Legend, producing  and available with AWD. For two-wheel drive vehicles, this was more power than that was available in the Toyota Estima, which was quoted to be .

The concept
This MPV was first seen as a concept car called Honda ASM at Tokyo Motor Show in late 2003 and finally made into a production half a year later with some cosmetic adjustments to its headlight, front grill and interior to make it more commercially friendly. Officially launched in mid-2004 for Japan domestic market.

The design
At 4840mm, the length is identical as the 3.0L second-generation Odyssey RA6 or about 1cm longer than XV50 Toyota Camry. The 1830 mm width is about 3 cm wider than the RA6 or about 2 cm wider than Camry. The different is on the clever space management making 70% of total space available as a cabin plus the height of 1790 mm, which is an extra 18 cm from RA6 or about 24 cm more than the current odyssey.

Safety
The combination of a new 30% stronger high-rigidity steel, the Honda G-Con technology and the unique double platform with low central gravity floor, first seen on Merc A-class, makes Elysion (one box car) to achieve the highest 6 stars rating by Nasva and become one of the safest Japanese passenger car production ever, even higher than the competitor's luxury three-box (hood-cabin-boot) sedans.

The high-rigidity body also benefited to the overall comfort as the car handles any rough roads with poise, free of squeaks found in many older Honda vehicles.

The top-of-the-line VZ model is equipped with an IHCC (intelligent highway cruise control) and CMS (collision mitigation sensor) that works with radio-wave radar installed in the front grill to warn driver if he or she get too close with the car ahead and the seat belt automatically tightening and brake ready, similar to the pre-cash system in the S-class. The radar can be double as night vision (a similar concept to the infrared night vision introduced in BMW) as it gives picture in a form of graphic of objects ahead displayed on its built in 8 inch navigation system at the dash.

Other safety equipment includes ABS (anti-lock brake), VSA (vehicle stability), TCS, sideslip, and AFS (adaptive front lighting) on its projector HID Xenon headlight.

Engine and brake
At launch, two choices of engines are available. The 2.4L i-VTEC K24A that is used in the current Odyssey produces about 160 horses and 22.2 kg-m of torque. With virtually the same specs and gear ratios, it behaves and drives very similar to the current Odyssey and sips about 10,2 km/L in 10–15 Japan standard test (3 times variable city driving stop and go and 1 time highway driving with 120 kg extra weight of two passengers and without a/c).

The compression ratio of 9.7 couples with an anti-knocking sensor and intelligent timing control makes it easy to take RON 95 grade. A similar 2.4L engine but with different overhead and higher compression ratio of 11.0 that produces 200hhp that is used in Honda JDM Odyssey Absolute is not yet available at this time for Elysion.

The other is an all new 3.0L V6 i-VTEC J30A with the VCM (variable cylinder management), shutting-off 3 cylinders on one bank of the V6 when reduced power is needed such as during cruising or driving down hill. The only tell-tale sign that the engine is running on 3 cylinders is when the ECO green light at the panels light up.

All Elysions are equipped with ventilated 4-disk brakes with ABS and EBD.

Trims and specifications
There are 6 different trim and grades plus 2 special AERO HDD editions. Three grade of 2.4L front-wheel-drive models are available, described as M, G and X.  There are also three 3.0L front-wheel-drive models, VG, VX and VZ.  Four-wheel-drive is optional on all models.

Chinese market
Honda announced to introduce the Elysion to the Chinese market in 2012. The Elysion was launched on June 7, 2012. The vehicle comes with a 2.4L i-VTEC K24Z5 engine, 5-speed auto transmission and is assembled locally by Honda's Chinese joint-venture Dongfeng Honda. It is positioned as a corporate people-mover.

Second generation (RC; 2015)

Previewed by the Honda Concept M MPV concept during the 2013 Shanghai Auto Show, the second-generation Honda Elysion for the Chinese market based on the fifth-generation Odyssey was unveiled at the Guangzhou Auto Show on 20th  November 2015, and launched on 9th  January 2016. It is  longer in length and  lower in height compared to the previous generation.

The second-generation Elysion is produced and sold exclusively in China by Dongfeng Honda, and was sold alongside the fifth-generation Odyssey produced by Guangqi Honda.

The Elysion Hybrid went on sale in September 2019, with redesigned grille and bumper.

The model received a facelift in December 2021, with the hybrid variant renamed to e:HEV Sport Hybrid.

References

External links
 Official website (China)

Elysion
Luxury vehicles
Vans
Minivans
Front-wheel-drive vehicles
All-wheel-drive vehicles
Cars introduced in 2004
2010s cars